The Challenge is a 1916 American silent drama film directed by Donald MacKenzie and starring Montagu Love, Helene Chadwick, and Charles Gotthold. The film was adapted from a 1911 play by Edward Childs Carpenter.

Cast
 Montagu Love as Quarrier
 Helene Chadwick as Alberta Bradley
 Charles Gotthold as Robert Lester
 Ben Hendricks Sr.

References

Bibliography
 Donald W. McCaffrey & Christopher P. Jacobs. Guide to the Silent Years of American Cinema. Greenwood Publishing, 1999.

External links
 

1916 films
1916 drama films
1910s English-language films
American silent feature films
Silent American drama films
American black-and-white films
Films directed by Donald MacKenzie
Pathé Exchange films
1910s American films